(born February 4, 1991) is a Japanese professional baseball player. He debuted in 2011 for the Hokkaido Nippon-Ham Fighters.

On December 15, 2017 the Brisbane Bandits announced that Sugiya had signed with the team to play in the Australian Baseball League.

He is also featured in a dance video on the Fighters' YouTube channel for The Fox (What Does the Fox Say?) (or referred to as The Fox Dance in marketing) which is currently the 3rd most viewed video on the Fighters' YouTube channel, with over 3.1 million views.

References

Living people
1991 births
Baseball people from Tokyo
Japanese expatriate baseball players in Australia
Nippon Professional Baseball infielders
Hokkaido Nippon-Ham Fighters players
Brisbane Bandits players